AK-1, AK1 or AK 1  may refer to:

 , a 1903 cargo ship
 Alaska Route 1, a state highway
 AK1 (gene), which encodes Adenylate kinase 1
 Aleksandrov-Kalinin AK-1, a 1920s Soviet prototype aeroplane
 Butte Municipal Airport, FAA location identifier AK1